The United States ambassador to Senegal is the official representative of the president of the United States to the head of state of Senegal. The ambassador is concurrently the ambassador to Guinea-Bissau, while residing in Dakar, Senegal.

Ambassadors and chiefs of mission

See also
Senegal – United States relations
Foreign relations of Senegal
Ambassadors of the United States

References
United States Department of State: Background notes on Senegal

Specific

External links
 United States Department of State: Chiefs of Mission for Senegal
 United States Department of State: Senegal
 United States Embassy in Dakar

Senegal
United States